Tecayehuatzin, was lord of Huexotzinco.

Poetry
Though remembered as a politician, Tecayehuatzin has been a poet with several poems surviving.

Poems attributed to Tecayehuatzin include:

Tla Oc Toncuicacan (Now Let Us Sing)
Tlatolpehualiztli (The Beginning of the Dialogue)
Itlatol Temictli (The Dream of a Word)

References

Nahuatl-language poets
Place of birth missing
Place of death missing